Robin Randall (born May 1, 1980, in Regina, Saskatchewan) is a male water polo player from Canada. He was a member of the Canada men's national water polo team, that claimed the bronze medal at the 2007 Pan American Games in Rio de Janeiro, Brazil.

Randall was a member of the first Canadian team to ever qualify for an Olympic Games (Beijing, 2008) where the team finished 11th.  In addition, he was the starting goaltender for the Canadian team's best-ever finish at the FINA World Championships (12th in Melbourne, 2007, and eighth in Rome, 2009).

See also
 Canada men's Olympic water polo team records and statistics
 List of men's Olympic water polo tournament goalkeepers

References

External links
 

1980 births
Living people
Sportspeople from Regina, Saskatchewan
Canadian male water polo players
Water polo goalkeepers
Water polo players at the 2007 Pan American Games
Water polo players at the 2008 Summer Olympics
Water polo players at the 2011 Pan American Games
Olympic water polo players of Canada
Pan American Games silver medalists for Canada
Pan American Games bronze medalists for Canada
Pan American Games medalists in water polo
Water polo players at the 2015 Pan American Games
Medalists at the 2011 Pan American Games
Medalists at the 2015 Pan American Games